George VI (Albert Frederick Arthur George; 14 December 1895 – 6 February 1952) was King of the United Kingdom and the Dominions of the British Commonwealth from 11 December 1936 until his death in 1952. He was also the last Emperor of India from 1936 until the British Raj was dissolved in August 1947, and the first Head of the Commonwealth following the London Declaration of 1949.
 
The future George VI was born in the reign of his great-grandmother Queen Victoria; he was named Albert at birth after his great-grandfather Albert, Prince Consort, and was known as "Bertie" to his family and close friends. His father ascended the throne as George V in 1910. As the second son of the king, Albert was not expected to inherit the throne. He spent his early life in the shadow of his elder brother, Prince Edward, the heir apparent. Albert attended naval college as a teenager and served in the Royal Navy and Royal Air Force during the First World War. In 1920, he was made Duke of York. He married Lady Elizabeth Bowes-Lyon in 1923, and they had two daughters, Elizabeth and Margaret. In the mid-1920s, he engaged speech therapist Lionel Logue to treat his stammer, which he learned to manage to some degree. His elder brother ascended the throne as Edward VIII after their father died in 1936, but Edward abdicated later that year to marry the twice-divorced American socialite Wallis Simpson. As heir presumptive to Edward VIII, Albert thereby became the third monarch of the House of Windsor, taking the regnal name George VI.

In September 1939, the British Empire and most Commonwealth countries—but not Ireland—declared war on Nazi Germany. War with the Kingdom of Italy and the Empire of Japan followed in 1940 and 1941, respectively. George VI was seen as sharing the hardships of the common people and his popularity soared. Buckingham Palace was bombed during the Blitz while the King and Queen were there, and his younger brother the Duke of Kent was killed on active service. George became known as a symbol of British determination to win the war. Britain and its allies were victorious in 1945, but the British Empire declined. Ireland had largely broken away, followed by the independence of India and Pakistan in 1947. George relinquished the title of Emperor of India in June 1948 and instead adopted the new title of Head of the Commonwealth. He was beset by smoking-related health problems in the later years of his reign and died of a coronary thrombosis in 1952. He was succeeded by his elder daughter, Elizabeth II.

Early life

Albert was born at York Cottage, on the Sandringham Estate in Norfolk, during the reign of his great-grandmother Queen Victoria. His father was Prince George, Duke of York (later King George V), the second and only surviving son of the Prince and Princess of Wales (later King Edward VII and Queen Alexandra). His mother, the Duchess of York (later Queen Mary), was the eldest child and only daughter of Francis, Duke of Teck, and Princess Mary Adelaide, Duchess of Teck. His birthday, 14 December 1895, was the 34th anniversary of the death of his great-grandfather Albert, Prince Consort. Uncertain of how the Prince Consort's widow, Queen Victoria, would take the news of the birth, the Prince of Wales wrote to the Duke of York that the Queen had been "rather distressed". Two days later, he wrote again: "I really think it would gratify her if you yourself proposed the name Albert to her."

The Queen was mollified by the proposal to name the new baby Albert, and wrote to the Duchess of York: "I am all impatience to see the new one, born on such a sad day but rather more dear to me, especially as he will be called by that dear name which is a byword for all that is great and good." Consequently, he was baptised "Albert Frederick Arthur George" at St Mary Magdalene Church, Sandringham on 17 February 1896. Formally he was His Highness Prince Albert of York; within the royal family he was known informally as "Bertie". The Duchess of Teck did not like the first name her grandson had been given, and she wrote prophetically that she hoped the last name "may supplant the less favoured one". Albert was fourth in line to the throne at birth, after his grandfather, father and elder brother, Edward.

Albert was ill often and was described as "easily frightened and somewhat prone to tears". His parents were generally removed from their children's day-to-day upbringing, as was the norm in aristocratic families of that era. He had a stammer that lasted for many years. Although naturally left-handed, he was forced to write with his right hand, as was common practice at the time. He had chronic stomach problems as well as knock knees, for which he was forced to wear painful corrective splints.

Queen Victoria died on 22 January 1901, and the Prince of Wales succeeded her as King Edward VII. Prince Albert moved up to third in line to the throne, after his father and elder brother.

Military career and education

Beginning in 1909, Albert attended the Royal Naval College, Osborne, as a naval cadet. In 1911 he came bottom of the class in the final examination, but despite this he progressed to the Royal Naval College, Dartmouth. When his grandfather Edward VII died in 1910, his father became King George V. Prince Edward became Prince of Wales, with Albert second in line to the throne.

Albert spent the first six months of 1913 on the training ship  in the West Indies and on the east coast of Canada. He was rated as a midshipman aboard  on 15 September 1913. He spent three months in the Mediterranean, but never overcame his seasickness. Three weeks after the outbreak of World War I he was medically evacuated from the ship to Aberdeen, where his appendix was removed by Sir John Marnoch. He was mentioned in dispatches for his actions as a turret officer aboard Collingwood in the Battle of Jutland (31 May – 1 June 1916), the great naval battle of the war. He did not see further combat, largely because of ill health caused by a duodenal ulcer, for which he had an operation in November 1917.

In February 1918 Albert was appointed Officer in Charge of Boys at the Royal Naval Air Service's training establishment at Cranwell. With the establishment of the Royal Air Force Albert transferred from the Royal Navy to the Royal Air Force. He served as Officer Commanding Number 4 Squadron of the Boys' Wing at Cranwell until August 1918, before reporting for duty on the staff of the RAF's Cadet Brigade at St Leonards-on-Sea and then at Shorncliffe. He completed a fortnight's training and took command of a squadron on the Cadet Wing. He was the first member of the British royal family to be certified as a fully qualified pilot.

Albert wanted to serve on the Continent while the war was still in progress and welcomed a posting to General Trenchard's staff in France. On 23 October, he flew across the Channel to Autigny. For the closing weeks of the war, he served on the staff of the RAF's Independent Air Force at its headquarters in Nancy, France. Following the disbanding of the Independent Air Force in November 1918, he remained on the Continent for two months as an RAF staff officer until posted back to Britain. He accompanied King Albert I of Belgium on his triumphal re-entry into Brussels on 22 November. Prince Albert qualified as an RAF pilot on 31 July 1919 and was promoted to squadron leader the following day.

In October 1919, Albert went up to Trinity College, Cambridge, where he studied history, economics and civics for a year, with the historian R. V. Laurence as his "official mentor". On 4 June 1920 his father created him Duke of York, Earl of Inverness and Baron Killarney. He began to take on more royal duties. He represented his father and toured coal mines, factories, and railyards. Through such visits he acquired the nickname of the "Industrial Prince". His stammer, and his embarrassment over it, together with a tendency to shyness, caused him to appear less confident in public than his older brother, Edward. However, he was physically active and enjoyed playing tennis. He played at Wimbledon in the Men's Doubles with Louis Greig in 1926, losing in the first round. He developed an interest in working conditions, and was president of the Industrial Welfare Society. His series of annual summer camps for boys between 1921 and 1939 brought together boys from different social backgrounds.

Marriage

In a time when royalty were expected to marry fellow royalty, it was unusual that Albert had a great deal of freedom in choosing a prospective wife. An infatuation with the already-married Australian socialite Lady Loughborough came to an end in April 1920 when the King, with the promise of the dukedom of York, persuaded Albert to stop seeing her. That year, he met for the first time since childhood Lady Elizabeth Bowes-Lyon, the youngest daughter of the Earl and Countess of Strathmore. He became determined to marry her. Elizabeth rejected his proposal twice, in 1921 and 1922, reportedly because she was reluctant to make the sacrifices necessary to become a member of the royal family. In the words of Lady Strathmore, Albert would be "made or marred" by his choice of wife. After a protracted courtship, Elizabeth agreed to marry him.

Albert and Elizabeth were married on 26 April 1923 in Westminster Abbey. Albert's marriage to someone not of royal birth was considered a modernising gesture. The newly formed British Broadcasting Company wished to record and broadcast the event on radio, but the Abbey Chapter vetoed the idea (although the Dean, Herbert Edward Ryle, was in favour).

From December 1924 to April 1925, the Duke and Duchess toured Kenya, Uganda, and the Sudan, travelling via the Suez Canal and Aden. During the trip, they both went big-game hunting.

Because of his stammer, Albert dreaded public speaking. After his closing speech at the British Empire Exhibition at Wembley on 31 October 1925, one which was an ordeal for both him and his listeners, he began to see Lionel Logue, an Australian-born speech therapist. The Duke and Logue practised breathing exercises, and the Duchess rehearsed with him patiently. Subsequently, he was able to speak with less hesitation. With his delivery improved, Albert opened the new Parliament House in Canberra, Australia, during a tour of the empire with the Duchess in 1927. Their journey by sea to Australia, New Zealand and Fiji took them via Jamaica, where Albert played doubles tennis partnered with a black man, Bertrand Clark, which was unusual at the time and taken locally as a display of equality between races.

The Duke and Duchess had two children: Elizabeth (called "Lilibet" by the family, and the future Elizabeth II) who was born in 1926, and Margaret who was born in 1930. The close family lived at 145 Piccadilly, rather than one of the royal palaces. In 1931, the Canadian prime minister, R. B. Bennett, considered Albert for Governor General of Canada—a proposal that King George V rejected on the advice of the Secretary of State for Dominion Affairs, J. H. Thomas.

Reluctant king

King George V had severe reservations about Prince Edward, saying "After I am dead, the boy will ruin himself in twelve months" and "I pray God that my eldest son will never marry and that nothing will come between Bertie and Lilibet and the throne." On 20 January 1936, George V died and Edward ascended the throne as King Edward VIII. In the Vigil of the Princes, Prince Albert and his three brothers (the new king, Prince Henry, Duke of Gloucester, and Prince George, Duke of Kent) took a shift standing guard over their father's body as it lay in state, in a closed casket, in Westminster Hall.

As Edward was unmarried and had no children, Albert was the heir presumptive to the throne. Less than a year later, on 11 December 1936, Edward abdicated in order to marry Wallis Simpson, who was divorced from her first husband and divorcing her second. Edward had been advised by British prime minister Stanley Baldwin that he could not remain king and marry a divorced woman with two living ex-husbands. He abdicated and Albert, though he had been reluctant to accept the throne, became king. The day before the abdication, Albert went to London to see his mother, Queen Mary. He wrote in his diary, "When I told her what had happened, I broke down and sobbed like a child."

On the day of Edward's abdication, the Oireachtas, the parliament of the Irish Free State, removed all direct mention of the monarch from the Irish constitution. The next day, it passed the External Relations Act, which gave the monarch limited authority (strictly on the advice of the government) to appoint diplomatic representatives for Ireland and to be involved in the making of foreign treaties. The two acts made the Irish Free State a republic in essence without removing its links to the Commonwealth.

Across Britain, gossip spread that Albert was physically and psychologically incapable of being king. No evidence has been found to support the contemporaneous rumour that the government considered bypassing him, his children and his brother Prince Henry, in favour of their younger brother Prince George, Duke of Kent. This seems to have been suggested on the grounds that Prince George was at that time the only brother with a son.

Early reign

Albert assumed the regnal name "George VI" to emphasise continuity with his father and restore confidence in the monarchy. The beginning of George VI's reign was taken up by questions surrounding his predecessor and brother, whose titles, style and position were uncertain. He had been introduced as "His Royal Highness Prince Edward" for the abdication broadcast, but George VI felt that by abdicating and renouncing the succession, Edward had lost the right to bear royal titles, including "Royal Highness". In settling the issue, George's first act as king was to confer upon his brother the title "Duke of Windsor" with the style "Royal Highness", but the letters patent creating the dukedom prevented any wife or children from bearing royal styles. George VI was forced to buy from Edward the royal residences of Balmoral Castle and Sandringham House, as these were private properties and did not pass to him automatically. Three days after his accession, on his 41st birthday, he invested his wife, the new queen consort, with the Order of the Garter.

George VI's coronation at Westminster Abbey took place on 12 May 1937, the date previously intended for Edward's coronation. In a break with tradition, his mother Queen Mary attended the ceremony in a show of support for her son. There was no Durbar held in Delhi for George VI, as had occurred for his father, as the cost would have been a burden to the Government of India. Rising Indian nationalism made the welcome that the royal party would have received likely to be muted at best, and a prolonged absence from Britain would have been undesirable in the tense period before the Second World War. Two overseas tours were undertaken, to France and to North America, both of which promised greater strategic advantages in the event of war.

The growing likelihood of war in Europe dominated the early reign of George VI. The King was constitutionally bound to support British prime minister Neville Chamberlain's appeasement of Hitler. When the King and Queen greeted Chamberlain on his return from negotiating the Munich Agreement in 1938, they invited him to appear on the balcony of Buckingham Palace with them. This public association of the monarchy with a politician was exceptional, as balcony appearances were traditionally restricted to the royal family. While broadly popular among the general public, Chamberlain's policy towards Hitler was the subject of some opposition in the House of Commons, which led historian John Grigg to describe George's behaviour in associating himself so prominently with a politician as "the most unconstitutional act by a British sovereign in the present century".

In May and June 1939, the King and Queen toured Canada and the United States; it was the first visit of a reigning British monarch to North America, although George had been to Canada prior to his accession. From Ottawa, George and Elizabeth were accompanied by Canadian prime minister Mackenzie King, to present themselves in North America as King and Queen of Canada. Both Mackenzie King and the Canadian governor general, Lord Tweedsmuir, hoped that George's presence in Canada would demonstrate the principles of the Statute of Westminster 1931, which gave full sovereignty to the British Dominions. On 19 May, George personally accepted and approved the Letter of Credence of the new U.S. ambassador to Canada, Daniel Calhoun Roper; gave royal assent to nine parliamentary bills; and ratified two international treaties with the Great Seal of Canada. The official royal tour historian, Gustave Lanctot, wrote "the Statute of Westminster had assumed full reality" and George gave a speech emphasising "the free and equal association of the nations of the Commonwealth".

The trip was intended to soften the strong isolationist tendencies among the North American public with regard to the developing tensions in Europe. Although the aim of the tour was mainly political, to shore up Atlantic support for the United Kingdom in any future war, the King and Queen were enthusiastically received by the public. The fear that George would be compared unfavourably to his predecessor was dispelled. They visited the 1939 New York World's Fair and stayed with President Franklin D. Roosevelt at the White House and at his private estate at Hyde Park, New York. A strong bond of friendship was forged between Roosevelt and the royal couple during the tour, which had major significance in the relations between the United States and the United Kingdom through the ensuing war years.

Second World War
Following the German invasion of Poland in September 1939, the United Kingdom and the self-governing Dominions other than Ireland declared war on Nazi Germany. The King and Queen resolved to stay in London, despite German bombing raids. They officially stayed in Buckingham Palace throughout the war, although they usually spent nights at Windsor Castle. The first night of the Blitz on London, on 7 September 1940, killed about one thousand civilians, mostly in the East End. On 13 September, the couple narrowly avoided death when two German bombs exploded in a courtyard at Buckingham Palace while they were there. In defiance, Elizabeth declared: "I am glad we have been bombed. It makes me feel we can look the East End in the face." The royal family were portrayed as sharing the same dangers and deprivations as the rest of the country. They were subject to British rationing restrictions, and U.S. First Lady Eleanor Roosevelt remarked on the rationed food served and the limited bathwater that was permitted during a stay at the unheated and boarded-up Palace. In August 1942, the King's brother, the Duke of Kent, was killed on active service.

In 1940, Winston Churchill replaced Neville Chamberlain as prime minister, though personally George would have preferred to appoint Lord Halifax. After the King's initial dismay over Churchill's appointment of Lord Beaverbrook to the Cabinet, he and Churchill developed "the closest personal relationship in modern British history between a monarch and a Prime Minister". Every Tuesday for four and a half years from September 1940, the two men met privately for lunch to discuss the war in secret and with frankness. George related much of what the two discussed in his diary, which is the only extant first-hand account of these conversations.

Throughout the war, George and Elizabeth provided morale-boosting visits throughout the United Kingdom, visiting bomb sites, munitions factories, and troops. George visited military forces abroad in France in December 1939, North Africa and Malta in June 1943, Normandy in June 1944, southern Italy in July 1944, and the Low Countries in October 1944. Their high public profile and apparently indefatigable determination secured their place as symbols of national resistance. At a social function in 1944, the Chief of the Imperial General Staff, Field Marshal Alan Brooke, revealed that every time he met Field Marshal Bernard Montgomery, he thought Montgomery was after his job. George replied: "You should worry, when I meet him, I always think he's after mine!"

In 1945, crowds shouted "We want the King!" in front of Buckingham Palace during the Victory in Europe Day celebrations. In an echo of Chamberlain's appearance, the King invited Churchill to appear with the royal family on the balcony to public acclaim. In January 1946, George addressed the United Nations at its first assembly, which was held in London, and reaffirmed "our faith in the equal rights of men and women and of nations great and small".

Empire to Commonwealth

George VI's reign saw the acceleration of the dissolution of the British Empire. The Statute of Westminster 1931 had already acknowledged the evolution of the Dominions into separate sovereign states. The process of transformation from an empire to a voluntary association of independent states, known as the Commonwealth, gathered pace after the Second World War. During the ministry of Clement Attlee, British India became the two independent Dominions of India and Pakistan in August 1947. George relinquished the title of Emperor of India, and became King of India and King of Pakistan instead. In late April 1949, the Commonwealth leaders issued the London Declaration, which laid the foundation of the modern Commonwealth and recognised George as Head of the Commonwealth. In January 1950, he ceased to be King of India when it became a republic. He remained King of Pakistan until his death. Other countries left the Commonwealth, such as Burma in January 1948, Palestine (divided between Israel and the Arab states) in May 1948 and the Republic of Ireland in 1949.

In 1947, George and his family toured southern Africa. The prime minister of the Union of South Africa, Jan Smuts, was facing an election and hoped to make political capital out of the visit. George was appalled, however, when instructed by the South African government to shake hands only with whites, and referred to his South African bodyguards as "the Gestapo". Despite the tour, Smuts lost the election the following year, and the new government instituted a strict policy of racial segregation.

Illness and death

The stress of the war had taken its toll on George's health, made worse by his heavy smoking, and subsequent development of lung cancer among other ailments, including arteriosclerosis and Buerger's disease. A planned tour of Australia and New Zealand was postponed after George suffered an arterial blockage in his right leg, which threatened the loss of the leg and was treated with a right lumbar sympathectomy in March 1949. His elder daughter and heir presumptive, Elizabeth, took on more royal duties as her father's health deteriorated. The delayed tour was re-organised, with Princess Elizabeth and her husband, Philip, Duke of Edinburgh, taking the place of the King and Queen.

George was well enough to open the Festival of Britain in May 1951, but on 4 June it was announced that he would need immediate and complete rest for the next four weeks, despite the arrival of Haakon VII of Norway the following afternoon for an official visit. On 23 September 1951, he underwent a surgical operation where his entire left lung was removed by Clement Price Thomas after a malignant tumour was found. In October 1951, Elizabeth and Philip went on a month-long tour of Canada; the trip had been delayed for a week due to George's illness. At the State Opening of Parliament in November, the Lord Chancellor, Lord Simonds, read the King's speech from the throne. The King's Christmas broadcast of 1951 was recorded in sections, and then edited together.

On 31 January 1952, despite advice from those close to him, George went to London Airport to see Elizabeth and Philip off on their tour to Australia via Kenya. It was his last public appearance. Six days later, at 07:30 GMT on the morning of 6 February, he was found dead in bed at Sandringham House in Norfolk. He had died in the night from a coronary thrombosis at the age of 56. His daughter flew back to Britain from Kenya as Queen Elizabeth II.

From 9 February George's coffin rested in St Mary Magdalene Church, Sandringham, before lying in state at Westminster Hall from 11 February. His funeral took place at St George's Chapel, Windsor Castle, on the 15th. He was interred initially in the Royal Vault until he was transferred to the King George VI Memorial Chapel inside St George's on 26 March 1969. In 2002, fifty years after his death, the remains of his widow, Queen Elizabeth The Queen Mother, and the ashes of his younger daughter, Princess Margaret, who both died that year, were interred in the chapel alongside him. In 2022, the remains of Queen Elizabeth II and her husband, Prince Philip, were also interred in the chapel.

Legacy

In the words of Labour Member of Parliament (MP) George Hardie, the abdication crisis of 1936 did "more for republicanism than fifty years of propaganda". George VI wrote to his brother Edward that in the aftermath of the abdication he had reluctantly assumed "a rocking throne" and tried "to make it steady again". He became king at a point when public faith in the monarchy was at a low ebb. During his reign, his people endured the hardships of war, and imperial power was eroded. However, as a dutiful family man and by showing personal courage, he succeeded in restoring the popularity of the monarchy.

The George Cross and the George Medal were founded at the King's suggestion during the Second World War to recognise acts of exceptional civilian bravery. He bestowed the George Cross on the entire "island fortress of Malta" in 1943. He was posthumously awarded the Order of Liberation by the French government in 1960, one of only two people (the other being Churchill in 1958) to be awarded the medal after 1946.

Colin Firth won an Academy Award for Best Actor for his performance as George VI in the 2010 film The King's Speech.

Honours and arms

Arms 
As Duke of York, Albert bore the royal arms of the United Kingdom differenced with a label of three points argent, the centre point bearing an anchor azure—a difference earlier awarded to his father, George V, when he was Duke of York, and then later awarded to his grandson Prince Andrew, Duke of York. As king, he bore the royal arms undifferenced.

Issue

Ancestry

Notes

References

Citations

General and cited sources

External links 

 George VI at the website of the Royal Family
 George VI at the website of the Royal Collection Trust
 
 
 
 

|-

|-

 
1895 births
1952 deaths
19th-century British people
20th-century British monarchs
Abdication of Edward VIII
Alumni of Trinity College, Cambridge
British Empire in World War II
British field marshals
British people of German descent
British princes
Burials at St George's Chapel, Windsor Castle
Chief Commanders of the Legion of Merit
Children of George V
Collars of the Order of Saints George and Constantine
Companions of the Liberation
Deaths from coronary thrombosis
Dukes of York
Earls of Inverness
Emperors of India
Field marshals of Australia
Freemasons of the United Grand Lodge of England
Grand Commanders of the Order of the Dannebrog
Grand Croix of the Légion d'honneur
3
3
3
Grand Crosses of the Order of Saint-Charles
Grand Crosses of the Order of the Phoenix (Greece)
Heads of state of Australia
Heads of state of Canada
Heads of state of India
Heads of state of New Zealand
Heads of state of Pakistan
Heads of the Commonwealth
Heirs to the British throne
House of Windsor
Kings of the Irish Free State
Knights Grand Cross of the Military Order of William
Knights Grand Cross of the Order of St Michael and St George
Knights Grand Cross of the Royal Victorian Order
Knights of St Patrick
Knights of the Garter
Knights of the Military Order of Savoy
Knights of the Thistle
Lords High Commissioner to the General Assembly of the Church of Scotland
Marshals of the Royal Air Force
Military personnel from Norfolk
Monarchs of Ceylon
Monarchs of South Africa
Monarchs of the Isle of Man
Monarchs of the United Kingdom
Peers created by George V
People educated at the Royal Naval College, Osborne
People from Sandringham, Norfolk
People of the Victorian era
People with speech impediment
Princes of the United Kingdom
Recipients of the Order of St. Vladimir, 4th class
Residents of White Lodge, Richmond Park
Royal Air Force personnel of World War I
Royal Navy admirals of the fleet
Royal Navy officers of World War I
Royal reburials
Royalty and nobility with disabilities
Scottish Freemasons
Sons of kings
Sons of emperors
World War II political leaders